The Queer Big Apple Corps (QBAC) is a community band based in New York City. Founded on September 24, 1979 as the New York Gay Community Marching Band, LGBAC is the third-oldest community band in the United States dedicated to serving the LGBT community.

Mission

The mission of LGBAC is to provide the lesbian and gay community with a supportive and friendly environment for musical and artistic expression and, through performance, to promote social acceptance, equality, and harmony for all. Membership is all-inclusive, predominantly lesbian, gay, bisexual, transgender, and queer, and the band welcomes heterosexual players as well.

Appearances

The band performs year-round as both a concert band and a marching band. 

As a concert band, LGBAC traditionally produces two concerts each year, one in the fall and the other in the spring. Chamber music concerts are offered occasionally. The Symphonic Band's Artistic Director is Kelly Watkins.

As a marching band, LGBAC marches in a wide variety of events, predominantly gay pride marches, July 4 parades, and the Greenwich Village Halloween Parade. The marching band includes a featured baton twirler, color guard and honor guard.

On Nov. 26, 2020 the band performed on national television as part of the annual Macy's Thanksgiving Day Parade.

See also
 San Francisco Lesbian/Gay Freedom Band
 Freedom Band of Los Angeles
 Pride of Indy Band and Color Guard
 Queer Urban Orchestra

References

External links
 Lesbian & Gay Big Apple Corps
 Twitter feed
 Lesbian & Gay Band Association

American marching bands
LGBT-themed musical groups
Musical groups established in 1979
Musical groups from New York City